The pronghorn (Antilocapra americana) is a species of artiodactyl (even-toed, hoofed) mammal indigenous to interior western and central North America. Though not an antelope, it is known colloquially in North America as the American antelope, prong buck, pronghorn antelope and prairie antelope, because it closely resembles the antelopes of the Old World and fills a similar ecological niche due to parallel evolution. It is the only surviving member of the family Antilocapridae.

During the Pleistocene epoch, about 11 other antilocaprid species existed in North America. Three other genera  (Capromeryx, Stockoceros and Tetrameryx) existed when humans entered North America but are now extinct.

As a member of the superfamily Giraffoidea, the pronghorn's closest living relatives are the giraffe and okapi. The Giraffoidea are in turn members of the infraorder Pecora, making pronghorns more distant relatives of the Cervidae (deer) and Bovidae (cattle, goats, sheep, antelopes, and gazelles), among others.

It is the symbol of the American Society of Mammalogists.

Discovery and taxonomy
Prior to the arrival of the Europeans, the pronghorn was particularly abundant in the region of the Plains Indians and the region of the indigenous people of the Northwest Plateau and was hunted as a principal food source by the local tribes. The pronghorn has also featured prominently in Native American mythology and oral history.

The scientific name of the pronghorn is Antilocapra americana. Although first seen and described by Spanish explorers in the 16th century, the species was not formally recorded or scrutinized until the expedition in 1804-06 by Captain Meriwether Lewis and Second Lieutenant William Clark. Following the discovery of a few subspecies of the sharp-tailed grouse, Lewis and Clark came across the pronghorn near the mouth of the Niobrara River, in present-day Nebraska. Clark was among the first Euro-Americans to publish the experience of killing a pronghorn, and described his experience as follows:

Lewis and Clark made several other observations on the behavior of the pronghorn and how the local tribes hunted them. They described the animal, which they referred to as the "Antelope" or the "Goat", as follows:

The pronghorn was first officially described by American ornithologist George Ord in 1815.

Description
Pronghorns have distinct white fur on their rumps, sides, breasts, bellies, and across their throats. The females are the same height as males, but weigh . The feet have two hooves, with no dewclaws.

The orbits (eye sockets) are prominent and set high on the skull.

Each horn of the pronghorn is composed of a slender, laterally flattened blade of bone which is thought to grow from the frontal bones of the skull, or from the subcutaneous tissues of the scalp, forming a permanent core. As in the Giraffidae, skin covers the bony cores, but in the pronghorn, it develops into a keratinous sheath which is shed and regrown annually. Unlike the horns of the family Bovidae, the horn sheaths of the pronghorn are branched, each sheath having a forward-pointing tine (hence the name pronghorn). Males are further differentiated from females in having a small patch of black hair at the angle of the mandible. Pronghorns have a distinct, musky odor. Males mark territory with a preorbital scent gland which is on the sides of the head. They also have very large eyes with a 320° field of vision. Unlike deer, pronghorns possess a gallbladder.

The pronghorn is the fastest land mammal in the Western Hemisphere, being built for maximum predator evasion through running. The top speed is dependent upon the length of time over which it is measured. Although it is slower than the African cheetah, it can sustain  top speeds much longer than cheetahs. The pronghorn may have evolved its running ability to escape from now-extinct predators such as the American cheetah, since its speed greatly exceeds that of all extant North American predators. Compared to its body size, the pronghorn has a large windpipe, heart, and lungs to allow it to take in large amounts of air when running. Additionally, pronghorn hooves have two long, cushioned, pointed toes which help absorb shock when running at high speeds. They also have an extremely light bone structure and hollow hair.

Pronghorns are built for speed, not for jumping. Since their ranges are sometimes affected by sheep ranchers' fences, they can be seen going under fences, sometimes at high speed. For this reason, the Arizona Antelope Foundation and others are in the process of removing the bottom barbed wire from the fences, and/or installing a barbless bottom wire.

Range and ecology

The present-day range of the pronghorn extends from southern Saskatchewan and Alberta in Canada south into the United States through Montana, Idaho, Utah, Nevada, Arizona, Nebraska, Wyoming, Colorado, New Mexico, Washington, and central Texas west to coastal southern California and northern Baja California Sur, to Sonora and San Luis Potosí in northern Mexico. They have been extirpated from Iowa and Minnesota in the United States and from Manitoba in Canada.

A subspecies known as the Sonoran pronghorn (A. a. sonoriensis) occurs in Arizona and Mexico. Other subspecies include the Mexican pronghorn (A. a. mexicana), the Oregon pronghorn (A. a. oregona), and the critically endangered Baja California pronghorn (A. a. peninsularis).

They eat a wide variety of plant foods, often including plants unpalatable or toxic to domestic livestock, though they also compete with them for food. In one study, forbs comprised 62% of their diet, shrubs 23%, and grasses 15%, while in another, cacti comprised 40%, grass 22%, forbs 20%, and shrubs 18%. Pronghorns also chew and eat (ruminate) cud.

Healthy pronghorn populations tend to stay within  of a water source.

The migrating pronghorn start travel from the foothills of the Pioneer Mountains through Craters of the Moon National Monument to the Continental Divide. Dr. Scott Bergen of the Wildlife Conservation Society says "This study shows that pronghorn are the true marathoners of the American West. With these new findings, we can confirm that Idaho supports a major overland mammal migration - an increasingly rare phenomenon in the U.S. and worldwide."

Cougars (Puma concolor), wolves (Canis lupus), coyotes (Canis latrans), grizzly bears (Ursus arctos horribilis) and bobcats (Lynx rufus) are major predators of pronghorns. Golden eagles (Aquila chrysaetos) have been reported to prey on fawns and adults. Jaguars (Panthera onca) also likely prey on pronghorns in their native range in the southwestern United States and in northern Mexico.

Social behavior and reproduction
Pronghorns form mixed-sex herds in the winter. In early spring, the herds break up, with young males forming bachelor groups, females forming harems, and adult males living solitarily. Some female bands share the same summer range, and bachelor male bands form between spring and fall. Females form dominance hierarchies with few circular relationships. Dominant females aggressively displace other females from feeding sites.

Adult males either defend a fixed territory that females may enter, or defend a harem of females. A pronghorn may change mating strategies depending on environmental or demographic conditions. Where precipitation is high, adult males tend to be territorial and maintain their territories with scent marking, vocalizing, and challenging intruders. In these systems, territorial males have access to better resources than bachelor males. Females also employ different mating strategies. "Sampling" females visit several males and remain with each for a short time before switching to the next male at an increasing rate as estrous approaches. "Inciting" females behave as samplers until estrous, and then incite conflicts between males, watching and then mating with the winners. Before fighting, males try to intimidate each other. If intimidation fails, they lock horns and try to injure each other. "Quiet" females remain with a single male in an isolated area throughout estrous. Females continue this mating behavior for two to three weeks.

When courting an estrous female, a male pronghorn approaches her while softly vocalizing and waving his head side to side, displaying his cheek patches. The scent glands on the pronghorn are on either side of the jaw, between the hooves, and on the rump. A receptive female remains motionless, sniffs his scent gland, and then allows the male to mount her.

Pronghorns have a gestation period of 7–8 months, which is longer than is typical for North American ungulates. They breed in mid-September, and the doe carries her fawn until late May. The gestation period is around six weeks longer than that of the white-tailed deer.  Females usually bear within a few days of each other. Twin fawns are common. Newborn pronghorns weigh , most commonly . In their first 21–26 days, fawns spend time hiding in vegetation. Fawns interact with their mothers for 20–25 minutes a day; this continues even when the fawn joins a nursery. The females nurse, groom, and lead their young to food and water, as well as keep predators away from them. Females usually nurse the young about three times a day. Males are weaned 2–3 weeks earlier than females. Sexual maturity is reached at 15 to 16 months, though males rarely breed until three years old. Their lifespan is typically up to 10 years, rarely 15 years.

Population and conservation

At the turn of the 20th century, members of the wildlife conservation group Boone and Crockett Club had determined that the extinction of the pronghorn was likely. In a letter from George Bird Grinnell, Boone and Crockett Club chairman of the game preservation committee, to Walter L. Fisher, Secretary of the Interior, Grinnell stated, "The Club is much concerned about the fate of the pronghorn which appears to be everywhere rapidly diminishing." By the 1920s, hunting pressure had reduced the pronghorn population to about 13,000. Boone and Crockett Club member Charles Alexander Sheldon, in a letter to fellow member Grinnell, wrote, "Personally, I think that the antelope are doomed, yet every attempt should be made to save them." Although the club had begun their efforts to save the pronghorn in 1910 by funding and restocking the Wichita Game Refuge in Oklahoma, the National Bison Range in Montana, and the Wind Cave National Park, in South Dakota, most of the efforts were doomed since experience demonstrated that after initial increases the pronghorns would die off because of the fenced enclosures. In 1927, Grinnell spearheaded efforts along with the help of T. Gilbert Pearson of Grinnell's National Audubon Society to create the Charles Alexander Sheldon Antelope Refuge in northern Nevada. About 2900 acres of land were jointly purchased by the two organizations and subsequently turned over to the Biological Survey as a pronghorn refuge. This donation was contingent upon the government's adding 30,000 acres of surrounding public lands. On June 20, 1929, United States President Herbert Hoover included the required public lands upon request of the Department of Agriculture and the Department of the Interior after learning that the Boone and Crockett Club and the National Audubon Society were underwriting the private land buyout. On January 26, 1931, Hoover signed the executive order for the refuge. On December 31, 1936, President Franklin Roosevelt signed an executive order creating a  tract; this was the true beginning for pronghorn recovery in North America.

The protection of habitat and hunting restrictions have allowed pronghorn numbers to recover to an estimated population between 500,000 and 1,000,000 since the 1930s. Some recent decline has occurred in a few localized populations, due to bluetongue disease which is spread from sheep, but the overall trend has been positive.

Pronghorn migration corridors are threatened by habitat fragmentation and the blocking of traditional routes. In a migration study conducted by Lava Lake Institute for Science and Conservation and the Wildlife Conservation Society, at one point, the migration corridor bottlenecks to an area only 200 yards wide.

Pronghorns are now quite numerous, and outnumbered people in Wyoming and parts of northern Colorado until just recently. They are legally hunted in western states for purposes of population control and food. No major range-wide threats exist, although localized declines are taking place, particularly to the Sonoran pronghorn, mainly as a result of livestock grazing, the construction of roads, fences, and other barriers that prevent access to historical habitat, illegal hunting, insufficient forage and water, and lack of recruitment.

Three subspecies are considered endangered in all (A. a. sonoriensis, A. a. peninsularis), or part of their ranges (A. a. mexicana). The Sonoran pronghorn has an estimated population of fewer than 300 in the United States and 200–500 in Mexico, while there are approximately 200 Peninsula pronghorn in Baja California. Populations of the Sonoran pronghorn in Arizona and Mexico are protected under the Endangered Species Act (since 1967), and a recovery plan for this subspecies has been prepared by U.S. Fish and Wildlife Service. Mexican animals are listed on CITES Appendix I. Pronghorns have game-animal status in all of the western states of the United States, and permits are required to trap or hunt pronghorns.

References

Explanatory notes

External links

 Migrations  Documentary produced by Wyoming PBS
 

 
Canadian Prairies
Extant Pleistocene first appearances
Fauna of the Great Plains
Fauna of the Rocky Mountains
Fauna of the Western United States
Herbivorous mammals
Mammals described in 1815
Mammals of Canada
Mammals of Mexico
Mammals of the United States
Taxa named by George Ord